Ortuella is a town and municipality located in the province of Biscay, in the Autonomous Community of Basque Country, northern  Spain.

Nowadays part of Greater Bilbao region, until the beginning of the 19th century it was integrated in the Valley of Somorrostro of the Encartaciones next to the Santurtzi. In 1901 the locality segregated from the Council of the Santurtzi, those days happening to denominate the Santurce-Ortuella. This segregation was motivated by an increase of population due to the mining height of end of the 19th century, being the district of Ortuella the one of greater population in the council. In the 1980s, and by means of the resolution of March 27, 1981, the name of the municipality definitively lost the term "Santurce", simply being "Ortuella", which was the usual name used by their citizens.

Ortuella was the site of a deadly explosion at the Marcelino Ugalde Primary School on October 23, 1980, that killed 50 schoolchildren and 14 adults, and injured  killed and injured an additional 128.

The patron saint of Ortuella is Saint Felix of Cantalica (May 18), name of the main church of the municipality.

Neighborhoods 
Ortuella is administratively divided into 6 neighborhoods or wards:
 Cadegal (Pop. 46)
 Orconera (Pop. 39)
 Nocedal (Pop. 204)
 Ortuella (Pop. 7.475)
 Triano (Pop. 10)
 Urioste (Pop. 803)

Demography

References

External links

 ORTUELLA in the Bernardo Estornés Lasa - Auñamendi Encyclopedia (Euskomedia Fundazioa) 
  

Municipalities in Biscay